Star Sixes is a competitive six-a-side indoor football competition where former international association football players are chosen to represent a senior national team for which they played. The inaugural event took place in July 2017 in London, at The O2 Arena. Further regionalised events were set for late-2017 in Asia. A 2019 edition was confirmed in October 2018.

Format
For the inaugural edition, all teams participating had a squad of ten players, with six being on the field of play including a captain. Squads were chosen by the team captain and the tournament organisers. There were three groups of four. In the groups, each team played each other team once and the top two from each group, plus two best third-placed teams, progressed to the quarter-finals, before facing off for a place in the semi-final and subsequent final. Six group matches (two from each group) took place on day one, before the same amount on days two and three. The quarter-finals were held on day three with the semi-finals, third place play-off and final following on the last day of competition. There was no extra time or penalties in the group stage but a penalty shoot-out could have been played if a knockout fixture ended tied. Group matches lasted for 20 minutes, while knockout fixtures lasted for 30 minutes, with short half-time breaks.

2017 edition

Before the launch, Steven Gerrard, Michael Owen, Robert Pires, Michael Ballack, Deco, Carles Puyol, Roberto Carlos and Jay-Jay Okocha were announced as player participants while Australia, Brazil, China, England, France, Germany, Italy, Mexico, Netherlands, Nigeria, Portugal and Spain were announced as nation participants. The 2017 edition was officially launched at The O2 Arena on 24 January 2017, during which more players were announced, namely Jens Lehmann, David James, Emile Heskey, Rio Ferdinand, Dominic Matteo and Gaizka Mendieta. Australia and Netherlands were replaced with Denmark and Scotland, but no reason was given.

The group stage draw, conducted by captains Ballack and Pires, took place on 24 March, it was broadcast live in the United Kingdom on Sky Sports News HQ.

Players
Gerrard, Pires, Ballack, Okocha, Deco, Matteo and Puyol were captains of their respective teams. Don Hutchison, Olivier Dacourt, Míchel Salgado, Martin Jørgensen, Stig Tøfting, William Gallas and Eric Abidal were later announced. Five players were added to Scotland's squad on 10 March, including Paul Dickov and Barry Ferguson. Marcel Desailly was one of three players added to France's squad on 15 March. Juliano Belletti was added for Brazil five days later. Spain added four players on 24 March, and the full Mexico squad was announced on 28 March. Gilberto Silva (Brazil) and Christian Abbiati (Italy) were announced on 31 March.

Maniche, Vítor Baía and Fernando Couto joined Portugal's squad on 12 April. Germany added three players days later. John Sivebæk and Daniel Jensen were added to Denmark's squad on 19 April. Scotland completed their squad on 21 April with the additions of Jackie McNamara, Mark Burchill and Neil McCann. Celestine Babayaro joined Nigeria's squad on 5 May. Five more players were announced in May, while Betsafe became the naming rights holders. On 26 May, Daniel Amokachi, Julius Aghahowa and Garba Lawal joined Nigeria. José Bosingwa joined Portugal on 7 June. Rivaldo was one of three players added for Brazil on 9 June, he was also named captain for Brazil. Fabrizio Ravanelli joined Italy on 15 June.

Dietmar Hamann joined Germany on 16 June, prior to Nuno Gomes, Raul Meireles, Kevin Kurányi, Mads Junker, Mikkel Beckmann, Chris Sørensen, Hjalte Nørregaard and Per Krøldrup all signing up on 23 June. Juninho, Djalminha, Danny Murphy, Paul Merson, Carlos Marchena and Lee Hendrie joined during the following week. Italy added six on 29 June, including Paolo Di Canio, but also lost two as Christian Abbiati and Simone Perrotta (injured) left the competition. Also on 29 June, three players joined Nigeria. On 30 June, Portugal completed their squad while China's entire team was announced. Youri Djorkaeff also joined France. Twelve new faces joined on 6 July, including two replacements; Richard Hughes replaced Neil McCann (who pulled out following his appointment as Dundee manager) while Erubey Cabuto took the place of the injured Jorge Campos. The squad lists were completed on 11 July with France, Germany and Spain adding players; Germany added three including Timo Hildebrand who replaces Lehmann; this means Germany have eleven players, it is presumed that one of their players will withdraw - that player was later confirmed as David Odonkor. German-born former Northern Irish international Maik Taylor was announced as the competition's back-up goalkeeper. Ferdinand withdrew from the competition on 13 July following the death of his mother. He was replaced by Luke Young.

Maik Taylor was a reserve goalkeeper for all nations.
Colin Hendry was a replacement for Scotland.

Group standings
Group A

Group B

Group C

Knockout phase
Knockout stage

Quarter-finals

Semi-finals

Third place play-off

Final

Top goalscorers
9 goals
  Míchel Salgado

6 goals
  Júlio Baptista
  Luis García

5 goals
  Ludovic Giuly
  Fernando Morientes

4 goals
  Chris Sørensen
  Yakubu

2019 edition

The competition's second edition was announced in October 2018, with the SSE Hydro in Glasgow, Scotland hosting. It will feature past participants England and Scotland, along with Northern Ireland, the Republic of Ireland, Wales and a Rest of the World XI. The schedule was revealed on 23 October, with the Rest of the World facing Northern Ireland in the opening fixture.

Players
Michael Owen and Robert Pires were the first players announced. Barry Ferguson returned to play for hosts Scotland, captaining the side in place of Dominic Matteo. Simon Donnelly, Keith Gillespie and Paddy McCourt were revealed as players in October 2018. Stiliyan Petrov and Jason McAteer were two of seven new faces announced on 18 October, on the same day as FansBet were announced as title sponsors. David James and Emile Heskey's return for England was confirmed on 25 October, with Wayne Bridge joining a day later. Maik Taylor, Stephen Craigan, Steven Reid, Gaizka Mendieta and Luke Young were added to their respective teams towards the end of October. Jay-Jay Okocha agreed to return on 1 November. Tony Capaldi and Colin Murdock joined Northern Ireland on 2 November, while Scotland announced three signings on 5 November. Vítor Baía and Ronald de Boer joined the ROTW later that day. Republic of Ireland's John Aldridge signed on 7 November, along with Wes Brown (England) and Pierre van Hooijdonk (Rest of the World) days later.

Joe Cole joined England on 15 November, days after he announced his retirement from professional football. Scotland's Lee McCulloch was announced on 16 November. Star Sixes revealed Martin Jørgensen and Ryan Giggs as players at the end of November, with Craig Bellamy, Darren Bent and Charlie Miller subsequently being announced. Dean Shiels was added to Northern Ireland's squad in December, along with David Dunn (England) and Owen Coyle (Rep. of Ireland). Ryan Giggs withdrew due to injury on 30 December. Before Giggs' departure, the rest of the tournament's players were revealed two days prior. Andy Legg and Simon Church were revealed on the opening day, replacing Giggs and Craig Bellamy; whose withdrawal coincided with his temporary departure as academy coach of Cardiff City after claims of bullying. Warren Feeney replaced Capaldi, Stephen Hunt replaced Reid and Niall Quinn replaced Aldridge.

Dominic Matteo was announced as Scotland's manager.

Group standings

Knockout phase
Fifth place play-off

Third place play-off

Final

Media coverage
2017

2019

References

External links
Official website

Football in the United Kingdom
Indoor soccer competitions